Tauranga City may refer to:

Tauranga City (district), the area covered by Tauranga City Council
Tauranga, a city in the North Island of New Zealand
Tauranga City FC, a former football team from Tauranga, now merged as part of Tauranga City United